Union Township is one of sixteen townships in Calhoun County, Iowa, United States.  As of the 2000 census, its population was 573.

History
Union Township was created in 1878.

Geography
According to the USGS, it contains two cemeteries: Evergreen and Evergreen.

References

External links
 City-Data.com

Townships in Calhoun County, Iowa
Townships in Iowa